Quaregna Cerreto is a comune (municipality) in the Province of Biella in the Italian region Piedmont,

Geography 
The comune borders the following municipalities: Cossato, Piatto, Valdengo, Vallanzengo, Valle San Nicolao, Vigliano Biellese.

History 
The comune of Quaregna Cerreto was born on 1 January 2019 due to the fusion of two pre-existent comunes, Quaregna and Cerreto Castello.

References

External links
 

Cities and towns in Piedmont